Heidi-Elke Gaugel (born 11 July 1959 in Schönaich) is a retired female German athlete who specialized in the 400 m.

Biography
Gaugel competed for West Germany at the 1984 Summer Olympics, held in Los Angeles, United States, where she won the bronze medal with her team mates Heike Schulte-Mattler, Ute Thimm and Gaby Bußmann in the women's 4 × 400 m relay event.

She married the middle-distance runner Harald Hudak. During the time she resided in Japan with her husband, she worked for NHK Radio 2's German radio course as a teacher. She represented the club VfL Sindelfingen.

References

External links
 
 

1959 births
Living people
People from Böblingen (district)
Sportspeople from Stuttgart (region)
West German female sprinters
Olympic bronze medalists for West Germany
Athletes (track and field) at the 1984 Summer Olympics
Olympic athletes of West Germany
Medalists at the 1984 Summer Olympics
Olympic bronze medalists in athletics (track and field)
VfL Sindelfingen athletes
Olympic female sprinters